Joseph C. Carter is a retired Brigadier General (BG) who was The Adjutant General (TAG) of the Massachusetts National Guard from 2007 - 2012.  He is the former chief of the Massachusetts Bay Transportation Authority Police. He currently lives in Oak Bluffs, Massachusetts with his wife Rae, an Oak Bluffs School teacher, and his daughter Emily.

Law enforcement career
Joseph C. Carter began his career in law enforcement in 1974 working for the City of Boston Penal Institutions Department from 1975 through 1978.  In 1978 he joined the Boston Police Department where his positions including patrol officer, detective, patrol supervisor, Deputy Superintendent, Superintendent, Chief of Staff of the department and Chief Administrative Hearing Officer, presiding over all departmental disciplinary trial boards.  In 1998 he took the position of Chief of Police in his home town of Oak Bluffs, Massachusetts, and held the position for 5 years.   From 2003 through 2007 he served as the head of Massachusetts Bay Transportation Authority Police, leaving the job in September 2007 to take the full-time Adjutant General's position in the state's National Guard.

Awards
American Public Transportation Association's (APTA) Innovation in Government Award – the only law enforcement recipient.
Webber-Seavey Award for Excellence in Law Enforcement (Semi-Finalist and thus one of the top 25 programs in the world), sponsored by the International Association of Chiefs of Police (IACP).
Massachusetts Performance Recognition Award, which recognized three Transit Police Initiatives.
Honored for his "outstanding leadership in law enforcement and his groundbreaking achievements in military service" by the Museum of African American History.

Special positions held
Member of the U.S. Department of Justice's Anti-Terrorism and Joint-Terrorism Task Force [ATTF/JTTF] (MA).
Member of the Municipal Police Training Committee, the Urban Crime Strategies Subcommittee of the Governor's Commission on Criminal Justice Innovation, and the Children's Trust Fund.
Member of the board of the Massachusetts Police Accreditation Commission, Inc., and New England Chiefs of Police Association.
2005-2006 First Vice President, International Association of Chiefs of Police
2006-2007 President of the International Association of Chiefs of Police.
1998–present Board member emeritus of the African American Heritage Trail History Project of Martha's Vineyard.

Military career
Carter served in the United States Army Reserve and the National Guard from 1974 through 2012.  In the Guard, he has held numerous positions including:

Commander, Army National Guard Training Site at the Massachusetts Military Reservation, Camp Edwards, Massachusetts
Assistant Adjutant General for the Joint Force Headquarters for the Massachusetts Army and Air National Guard.

In August 2007 it was announced that he had been selected by Massachusetts governor Deval Patrick to succeed Brigadier General Oliver Mason and become the first African-American TAG in the 370-year history the state's Guard. He took over the position on September 21, 2007, but was officially sworn into the job on October 26, 2007 by Governor Patrick at a ceremony conducted at the Massachusetts State House.  During the ceremony Carter received a 13 gun howitzer salute from the 101st Field Artillery Regiment, and was awarded the Legion of Merit.  During his tenure as TAG he received a state (but not federal) promotion to major general and Massachusetts has been twice recognized for excellence in Diversity and Equal Opportunity.

Suspension and retirement
On March 29, 2012 he was suspended with pay from the National Guard by Governor Patrick pending the outcome of an investigation into an allegation that he raped a servicewoman in his unit in 1984 during training at Eglin Air Force Base in Florida.  The accusations resurfaced in 2010 during court martial proceedings against Lt. Col. Mark Murray who serves as the Massachusetts National Guard's quartermaster. Carter initiated court martial proceedings against Murray "after state and federal investigations uncovered a range of alleged improprieties, including misusing federal money, hiring a convicted felon to do legal work, and threatening a whistleblower" and after Murray refused to resign in lieu of court martial. During the court martial, Murray alleged that the charges against him were retaliation by Carter for his role as investigating officer when the charges were first raised two years after the alleged attack.  The court martial found that Murray had "failed to comply with federal law in managing Guard funds", but they voted 3 to 2 to allow Murray to retain his job. After the verdict, Murray was stripped of most of his responsibilities. It was alleged that Carter also retaliated against two of the judges in that court martial by trying to have them forced out because he was not happy with the verdict. Further investigation into the rape accusations was in part the result of a background check required for Carter's federal promotion to major general. The promotion "must be approved by the Army and confirmed by the US Senate".

During the investigation, Carter alleged that the rape charges against him are part of a long-running smear campaign against him. He states that the accusations are the result of his efforts to change a law that made firing certain state military division employees impossible without a court martial.  He also claims senior officials were also angry with him for changing the National Guard's work week from a ten-hour-a-day four-day-a-week work schedule to an eight-hour-a-day five-day-a-week work schedule.

Carter claimed he did not remember the soldier who made the accusations and had "categorically denied the allegation". Carter also claimed to have not known of the allegations until they were raised during the 2010 court martial.  This is in contrast to a statement by Murray who claims Carter was questioned during the investigation about the incident and stated "Well I hope this doesn't impact me some time in my future." Part of Carter's denial was also contradicted by his former company commander who stated he recalled the night in question and remembered Carter helping the woman after a night of socializing.  He stated that Carter and the victim got out of a car near the beach, and that Carter later returned alone.

On April 3, 2012, Governor Patrick selected Massachusetts Air National Guard Major General L. Scott Rice to serve as acting Adjutant General during Carter's suspension.

On September 19, 2012 BG Carter agreed to retire from the Massachusetts National Guard after a report from military investigators that "found probable cause that he indecently assaulted a subordinate while the two were on a training exercise in Florida in 1984". Investigators stated that they did not find evidence to substantiate a charge of rape, but concluded that "he probably touched her inappropriately, engaged in conduct unbecoming of an officer, and later made false claims about the incident". Carter released a statement stating that he was "vindicated because the Army did not deem the most serious allegation against me to be credible" but was "disappointed that the Army has found probable cause for other alleged offenses. I never assaulted anyone, and I cooperated fully with CID's investigation and told the truth". He further stated that he was retiring to prevent the "unfounded allegations" from becoming a distraction to the National Guard.

Education

Civilian
Carter holds a bachelor's degree in Organizational Behavior and Management from Lesley College and Master of Arts degree in Criminal Justice Administration from Atlanta University.

Military
Carter is a 1992 graduate of the U.S. Army Command and General Staff College and a 2002 graduate of US Army War College obtaining a Master of Strategic studies degree.

Law enforcement
Carter is a graduate of the FBI National Academy's 140th Session; a 1986 graduate of the Police Executive Research Forum's Senior Management Institute for Police; a 1991 graduate of the ABA's National Judicial College - Administrative Law Judge course; as well as a graduate of numerous other federal, state and military law enforcement programs.

See also
  Adjutant General of Massachusetts
  National Guard of the United States

References

External links

CIVIL ACTION NO. 04-10927-RGS RONALD JORDAN and ROBERT MACKAY v. JOSEPH C. CARTER, Individually and in his capacity as Chief of the MBTA Police Department and THE MBTA POLICE DEPARTMENT
IACP Urges Congress to Focus on Terrorism Prevention, The Police Chief
Boston transit riders face random searches, MSNBC.com
International Association of Chiefs of Police web site
Massachusetts National Guard Home page
MBTA Police Home page
International Association of Chiefs of Police Governing Body
Oak Bluffs Police Home page

1956 births
Living people
United States Army generals
African-American United States Army personnel
Recipients of the Legion of Merit
Clark Atlanta University alumni
United States Army Command and General Staff College alumni
United States Army War College alumni
American police chiefs
National Guard (United States) generals
Military in Massachusetts
People from Oak Bluffs, Massachusetts
Boston Police Department officers
Lesley University alumni
Adjutants General of Massachusetts
21st-century African-American people
20th-century African-American people